Neko chigura (nekochigura) or Neko tsugura (nekotsugura) is a kind of cat house made of straw in Japan. It is a folk craft of Sekikawa-mura, Niigata-ken, or Akiyamago (the area of Tsunan-machi, Niigata-ken and Sakae-mura, Nagano-ken). It is called "Nekochigura" in Sekikawa, and "Nekotsugura" in Akiyamago (ja).

Chigura or tsugura is written as "稚座" in kanji, and means bassinet in the Niigata dialect where there is the custom to use rice straw baskets for babies. Niigata constitutes, in fact, a rice granary and the basket industry is a side business in the winter season when the prefecture becomes snowbound.

Presently, chigura for cats vary in shape according to the originality of the producer.  There are two common types: Pillbox type and pot-shaped type; there are also some basket types.  As cats seem to prefer small enclosed spaces, they like neko chigura to sleep in.

See also

 Cat café#Japan
 Culture of Japan
 Japanese handicrafts

Notes

External links
Sekikawa-mura Nekochigura: Official Site

Cat equipment
Japanese bamboowork
Buildings and structures used to confine animals
Straw objects